Pek may refer to:

 Pekoe tea (Pek.), a grade of Ceylon and tea leaf
 Pek, a processed meat product somewhat similar to spam
 Pek (river), a river in eastern Serbia
 Pek, a Ukrainian name of the Slavic deity otherwise known as Peklenc

People
 Pęk, a Polish surname
 Peter Pek, Malaysian businessman
 Khadaffy Janjalani, also known as Pek, (1975–2006), Filipino terrorist leader

See also
 
 PEK (disambiguation)
 Peck, a measure of volume
 Peck (disambiguation)
 Polyetherketones